Frank Dancevic won first edition of the tournament by defeating Igor Andreev 7–6(7–4), 6–3 in the final.

Seeds

Draw

Finals

Top half

Bottom half

References

 Main Draw
 Qualifying Draw

Dallas Tennis Classic - Singles
2012 Singles